Fu-Tong Liu is a Taiwanese dermatologist.

Liu studied chemistry at National Taiwan University and completed a doctorate in the same field at the University of Chicago in 1976. He started postdoctoral research at the University of Illinois at Urbana–Champaign and ended postdoctoral work at Scripps Research. Liu remained at Scripps while earning an MD at the University of Miami School of Medicine. His medical residency took place at the University of California, San Diego. Liu left Scripps for the University of California, Davis faculty in 2001. At UCD, Liu was chair professor and later appointed distinguished professor in 2012. He returned to Taiwan in 2011, for a full professorship at National Taiwan University and a concurrent adjunct professorship at National Yang-Ming University. Liu has also served as chair professor at China Medical University and Tzu Chi University. In 2012, Liu was elected a member of Academia Sinica. The next year, he was elected to fellowship of the American Association for the Advancement of Science.

References

Year of birth missing (living people)
Living people
Taiwanese expatriates in the United States
Taiwanese dermatologists
20th-century Taiwanese scientists
21st-century Taiwanese scientists
Allergologists
National Taiwan University alumni
University of Chicago alumni
Leonard M. Miller School of Medicine alumni
University of California, Davis faculty
Members of Academia Sinica
Fellows of the American Association for the Advancement of Science
Academic staff of the National Taiwan University